Museum Betje Wolff is a history and decorative arts museum in Beemster, North Holland in the Netherlands.

The museum, founded in 1950, is located in a former Dutch Reformed Church. It is named after Betje Wolff. Wolff lived in the building with her husband, Adrian Wolff, who was a pastor. The museum library has a complete collection of all of Betje Wolff's works.

The museum has rooms decorated in period styles of three different centuries. There is an 18th-century garden. It focuses on the lifestyle of residents of Beemster.

References

External links
 Beemster History Society

Museums established in 1950
1950 establishments in the Netherlands
Historic house museums in the Netherlands
Museums in North Holland
Rijksmonuments in North Holland
Purmerend
20th-century architecture in the Netherlands